Tyranny of Beauty (1995) is the fifty-first release and twenty-third major studio album by Tangerine Dream. Guitarist Zlatko Perica does not appear on this album or its follow up Goblins' Club (1996). His absence is filled by guest musicians Gerald Gradwohl and Mark Hornby on both releases and during the groups London performance in November 1996.

Track listing

Personnel
Tangerine Dream
 Edgar Froese – electric and acoustic guitar, keyboards, twelve-string guitar, drums, recording engineer, composer, producer
 Jerome Froese – electric and acoustic guitar, keyboards, drums, percussion, recording engineer, composer
 Linda Spa – alto and soprano saxophones, English horn, sax arrangement on "Largo"
Additional musicians 
 Gerald Gradwohl – electric and acoustic guitar
 Mark Hornby – electric and acoustic guitar, twelve-string guitar, EBow
Credits
 Christian Gstettner – recording engineer
 Peter Baumann – composer "Stratosfear"
 Christopher Franke – composer "Stratosfear"
 George Frideric Handel – composer "Largo"
 Gisela Kloetzer – string arrangements on "Largo"

Promo
A promotional CD-5 was released with edited versions of four tracks and the bonus track "Quasar", which was released on later versions of Tyranny of Beauty.

CD-ROM
A CD-ROM of the same title was published in Italy in 1995 as a freebie with the magazine New Age and New Sounds (catalogue no. NANS 047/B). Apart from the multimedia content it includes two audio tracks:

References

1995 albums
Tangerine Dream albums
Virgin Records albums